Voices is the ninth studio album by American pop music duo Daryl Hall & John Oates. The album was released on July 29, 1980, by RCA Records. It spent 100 weeks on the Billboard 200, peaking at number 17. In 2020, the album was ranked number 80 on The Greatest 80 Albums of 1980 by Rolling Stone magazine.

Background
The album slowly became a massive hit, spinning off four singles into the top 40 of the American pop charts: "How Does It Feel to Be Back" (number 30 in summer, 1980), "You've Lost That Lovin' Feelin'" (number 12 in fall, 1980), "Kiss on My List" (number 1 for three weeks in spring, 1981), and "You Make My Dreams" (number 5 in summer, 1981). "Everytime You Go Away" was not released as a single but was covered by Paul Young in 1985, when it went to number 1 on the Billboard Hot 100 on July 27, 1985.  Singers Elisa Chan and Danny Summer covered this song in Cantonese in 1985 and 1986.

Voices was the first album that Hall & Oates produced by themselves, working in conjunction with renowned engineer Neil Kernon.

Track listing

Personnel 
 Daryl Hall – lead vocals (2-9, 11), backing vocals, mando-guitar, keyboards, synthesizers (including ARP String Ensemble and Yamaha CP30), vocoder, percussion
 John Oates – lead vocals (1, 4, 7, 10), backing vocals, 6-string and 12-string guitars, percussion, Roland CR-78 drum machine
 G. E. Smith – lead guitars
 John Siegler – bass 
 Jerry Marotta – drums 
 Chuck Burgi – drums, percussion
 Charles DeChant – saxophone

Additional musicians 
 Jeff Southworth – lead guitar on "Kiss On My List"
 Ralph Schuckett – organ on "Everytime You Go Away"
 Mike Klvana – synthesizers on "Africa"

Production 
 Produced by Daryl Hall and John Oates 
 Engineered by Neil Kernon and Bruce Tergeson
 Assistant Engineers – Jon Smith and John Palermo
 Mixed by Neil Kernon
 Recorded at The Hit Factory and Electric Lady Studio, New York City.
 Mastered by Bob Ludwig at Masterdisk, New York City.
 Album Cover Design – Sara Allen
 Art Direction – J.J. Stelmach
 Photography – Ebet Roberts
 Equipment Technician – Mike Klvana

Charts and certifications
The album debuted at number 75 on the Billboard 200 the week of August 16, 1980 as the highest debut of the week. After ten months since its debut on the chart, it reached and peaked at number 17 on June 13, 1981, making it their highest charting album since 1975 when Daryl Hall & John Oates peaked at number 17 too. It remained on the chart for one hundred weeks, more than any other album by the duo. It was certified gold by the RIAA on May 6, 1981 for shipments of 500,000 units, it reached platinum status on January 22, 1982 denoting shipments of one million.

Weekly charts

Certifications

Singles

Bibliography

References

1980 albums
Hall & Oates albums
RCA Records albums
Synth-pop albums by American artists